Anna Gurney (1795–1857) was an English scholar, philanthropist, geologist and a member of the Gurney family of Norfolk.

Background and education
Anna Gurney was born on 31 December 1795, the youngest child of Richard Gurney and his second wife Rachel. The Gurney family and most of their connections were Quakers (members of the Society of Friends), and many were involved with banking.  Richard had married his first wife Agatha, only surviving child of the banker David Barclay of Youngsbury, who brought his daughters up in "what may be termed the best aristocratic Quaker life of the middle of the eighteenth century". Anna's eldest half-sibling was Hudson Gurney, twenty years her senior; as adults, they shared scholarly interests. Agatha bore another child, a daughter named after her, and died a few days later. It was felt by the Barclay grandparents that Richard was too much a typical country squire and too little a serious religious man, so they asked a sixteen-year-old niece to live with the widower and "instil some sterner Quaker spirit" into the children. Rachel was the second daughter of Osgood Hanbury of Holfield Grange, near Coggeshall, Essex. Within a year, Richard and Rachel married.

Anna had two full siblings, Richard ("Dick"), born 1783, and Elizabeth, born 1784. There was then a gap of over a decade before Anna's birth in 1795; she was the youngest child. The family seat was Keswick Hall, about three miles from Norwich, Norfolk. Richard Gurney died 16 July 1811, when Anna was 15.  

As a child, (10 months old) Gurney had poliomyelitis (polio), which paralysed her lower limbs, meaning from a young age Gurney was a wheelchair user. Throughout Gurney's adult life, Anna devoted a lot of resources and time to many different causes. This included abolition work, education for children, geology which mainly focused her geological research on local portions of the Cromer Forest Bed Formation, and purchasing a Manby Mortar, an apparatus used to fire a line to a ship in peril for the town of Sheringham. 

At an early age she learnt Latin, Greek, Hebrew, and Anglo-Saxon.

Adult life
In 1819 she brought out anonymously, in a limited impression for private circulation, A Literal Translation of the Saxon Chronicle. By a Lady in the Country. This work, which went to a second edition, was commended by the highly respected academic James Ingram, in his Saxon Chronicle with Translations, 1823, preface, p. 12.

In 1825, after the death of her mother, she went to reside at Northrepps Cottage, near Cromer, with Sarah-Maria Buxton. Buxton died in 1839, and Gurney continued to inhabit the cottage for the remainder of her life. While living there she procured at her own expense one of Manby's apparatus for saving the lives of seamen wrecked on dangerous coasts, and in cases of urgency she caused herself to be carried down to the beach, and directed the operations from her chair. Gurney worked with Amelia Opie to create an Anti-Slavery Society in Norwich.

Gurney visited Rome, Athens and Argos, and was contemplating a voyage to the Baltic. In 1845 she became an associate of the British Archaeological Association, being the first lady member who joined the association. In the Archæologia, xxxii. 64–8, is a communication from her on The Discovery of a Gold Ornament near Mundesley in Norfolk, and in xxxiv. 440–2 is a paper On the Lost City of Vineta, a submerged Phœnician city.

In her later life she studied Danish, Swedish, and Russian literature. She also owned at least one Old Norse-Icelandic manuscript, an eighteenth-century copy of Víglundar saga, now in the University of Wisconsin-Madison Libraries Special Collections. After a short illness she died at the residence of her brother, Hudson Gurney, at Keswick, near Norwich, on 6 June 1857, and was buried alongside Sarah-Maria Buxton in Overstrand Church.

Family
Anna's half-brother Hudson Gurney was an MP for much of 1812–1832, active in abolitionism, and, once out of Parliament, was appointed High Sheriff of Norfolk. He was elected fellow of the Society of Antiquaries on 12 March 1818, and was vice-president from 1822 to 1846. He contributed to the society many hundreds of pounds for the publication of Anglo-Saxon works. He was also a Fellow of the Royal Society (elected 15 January 1818), a member of the British Archæological Association from 1843, vice-president of the Norfolk and Norwich Archæological Society and a supporter of the Norwich Museum and Literary Institute.

Anna's half-sister Agatha ("Gatty") married Samson Hanbury of Hanbury Manor; they were connected to Truman's Brewery, one of the largest brewers in the world in the nineteenth century. Samson was the brother of Rachel, Anna's mother.

Anna's brother Richard Hanbury Gurney (1783–1854, always known as Dick) was a banker and MP. He lived at Thickthorn Hall, in Hethersett near Norwich. He was ejected from the Quakers for giving money to a military purpose.

Rachel's sister Anna was the mother of social reformer Fowell Buxton. Anna Gurney helped him in his research.

References

Attribution

1795 births
1857 deaths
British abolitionists
British scholars
Anna
People from Cromer
People from Keswick, South Norfolk
People with paraplegia